Paradise Hill Airport  was located adjacent to Paradise Hill, Saskatchewan, Canada.

See also 
 List of airports in Saskatchewan
 List of defunct airports in Canada

References 

Defunct airports in Saskatchewan
Frenchman Butte No. 501, Saskatchewan